"Pump It Up" is a song by American rapper Joe Budden. It was released on March 24, 2003, as the lead single from his first album, Joe Budden (2003). The song peaked at number 38 on the US Billboard Hot 100 and at number 13 in the United Kingdom.

Produced by Just Blaze, the beat was originally turned down by Beanie Sigel, Freeway and Jay-Z before Budden used it. It contains a sample from "Soul Vibrations" as performed by Kool & the Gang. The song was nominated for the Best Male Rap Solo Performance award at the 46th Annual Grammy Awards.

Music video
The music video was partially inspired by the 2002 film, The Ring, and begins with three women putting a videotape containing Pump It Up into a VCR player. Budden then appears on the television screen and eventually walks out of it, when the video cuts to him performing the song to a large crowd in a park. The music video features cameos from DJ Envy, DJ Clue and Dub-B.

Remix
The official remix is a mash-up of two beef freestyles by Jay-Z and Budden against the other person. The rapper's freestyle of the song is included in the deluxe edition of his compilation album, The Hits Collection, Volume One (2010).

On December 12, 2015, during a guest appearance on an episode of Abstract Radio, a Beats 1 radio show on Apple Music hosted by rapper Q-Tip, Just Blaze debuted some exclusive unreleased music, which included an unreleased official remix of the song with a verse by the rapper Busta Rhymes.

Track listing
US 12-inch vinyl
 "Pump It Up" (clean) – 4:14
 "Pump It Up" (dirty) – 4:13
 "Pump It Up" (instrumental) – 4:13
 "Pump It Up" (acapella) – 4:09

Charts

Weekly charts

Year-end charts

Release history

References

2003 singles
2003 songs
Def Jam Recordings singles
Joe Budden songs
Music videos directed by Erik White
Song recordings produced by Just Blaze
Songs written by Fred Wesley
Songs written by James Brown
Songs written by Joe Budden
Songs written by Just Blaze